Slobodan Dimitrijević (20 April 1941 – 4 December 1999) was a Serbian television and film actor.

Partial filmography

Igre na skelama (1961) - Stasa
Treasure of the Silver Lake (1962) - Rollender Donner
Prometheus of the Island (1964) - Mladi Mate
The Key (1965) - Ivan (segment "Cekati")
The Oil Prince (1965) - Knife
Duel at Sundown (1965) - Rancher (uncredited)
The Desperado Trail (1965) - Schneller Panther [Quick Panther]
Manhattan Night of Murder (1965) - Alec Korsky
Monday or Tuesday (1966) - Marko Pozgaj
Target for Killing (1966) - KIller
Fruits amers - Soledad (1967)
Murderers Club of Brooklyn (1967) - Malbran
Illusion (1967) - Ivo
Lelejska gora (1968) - Lado Tajovic
Sunce tudjeg neba (1968) - Gane
Weisse Wölfe (1969) - Listiger Fuchs
Vreme bez vojna (1969) - Fidan
Bronte: cronaca di un massacro che i libri di storia non hanno raccontato (1972) - Nunzio Sampieri
Walter Defends Sarajevo (1972) - Suri
Istrel (1972) - Emanuel
Little Mother (1973)
Sutjeska (1973) - Kurir pri glavnom stabu
So (1973)
SB zatvara krug (1974) - Bozovic
Pogled iz potkrovlija (1974) - Inspector Mark Santini
The Peaks of Zelengora (1976) - Andrija
Stand Up Straight, Delfina (1977) - Mladen
Operation Stadium (1977) - Sturmbannführer Ebner
Stici pre svitanja (1978) - Ivan
 (1978) - SantiagoJournalist (1979) - Slavko, predsjednik radnickog savjetaTrofej (1979) - Vuksan TomasevicSomewhere, Sometime (1979)Siroko je lisce (1981) - BrankoSnadji se, druze (1981)The Winds of War (1983) - Russian soldier (uncredited)Opasni trag (1984) - Stranac (1985, TV Mini-Series) - MakejewGymkata (1985) - TamerlaneOut of Control (1985) - GypsyThe War Boy (1985) - SS captainDonator (1989) - Kapetan KochHamburg Altona (1989)Le grand ruban (Truck) (1990)Gavre Princip - Himmel unter Steinen (1990)Born to Ride (1991) - SS Col. MuhlGospa (1995) - PilotEarth Song (1995, music video)Comanche Territory (1997) - Oficial en el casinoThe Peacemaker (1997) - Serb OfficialPont Neuf (1997) - Racic's FatherZavaravanje (1998)Četverored'' (1999) - Treci Isljednik

External links

1941 births
1999 deaths
Actors from Niš
Serbian male television actors
Yugoslav male television actors
Serbian expatriates in Croatia
Serbian male film actors
Yugoslav male film actors